Top Cops is a documentary program broadcast in the United States on the CBS television network from 1990 to 1993.  Reruns aired on the USA Network in 1996.

Each episode of Top Cops consisted of two to three segments featuring commended police officers and dramatic recreations of the events leading to their having been honored.

References

External links
 

CBS original programming
1990 American television series debuts
1993 American television series endings
1990s American crime television series
Television series by CBS Studios
Television series by 20th Century Fox Television
Television series featuring reenactments